Woollybutt is a common name for several plants in the genus Eucalyptus and may refer to:

Eucalyptus botryoides
Eucalyptus delegatensis
Eucalyptus miniata, Darwin woollybutt
Eucalyptus longifolia, endemic to eastern Australia